Martin Francis Dixon (born 29 September 1955) is a former Australian politician. Dixon was a Liberal Party member of the Victorian Legislative Assembly from 1996 to 2018, representing the electorates of Dromana (1996–2002) and Nepean (2002–2018). He was Minister for Education in the Baillieu and Napthine governments from 2010 to 2014.

Dixon has been a member of a number of Joint Parliamentary Committees, as well as holding various portfolio positions in shadow cabinet including Education and Training, Education Services, Skills and Employment, Innovation, Victorian Communities and Veterans Affairs.

Education
Dixon was educated at Marcellin College, the Australian Catholic University and La Trobe University. He holds a Diploma of Teaching and a Bachelor of Education degree. Prior to entering Parliament, he worked as a teacher, a school principal and as Deputy Chairman of Primary Education at the Catholic Education Office in Melbourne.

References

External links
 Parliamentary voting record of Martin Dixon at Victorian Parliament Tracker
 Hon Martin Dixon. Parliament of Victoria
 Official website

|-

1955 births
Living people
Politicians from Melbourne
Members of the Victorian Legislative Assembly
Liberal Party of Australia members of the Parliament of Victoria
Australian Catholic University alumni
La Trobe University alumni
21st-century Australian politicians
People educated at Marcellin College, Bulleen\
Australian schoolteachers